The sternocostal joints, also known as sternochondral joints or costosternal articulations, are synovial plane joints of the costal cartilages of the true ribs with the sternum. The only exception is the first rib, which has a synchondrosis joint since the cartilage is directly united with the sternum. The sternocostal joints are important for thoracic wall mobility.

The ligaments connecting them are:
 Articular capsules
 Interarticular sternocostal ligament
 Radiate sternocostal ligaments
 Costoxiphoid ligaments

Clinical significance 
Ankylosis, joint stiffness caused by ossification, may occur at the sternocostal joints.

See also
 Costochondritis

References

External links

Joints
Thorax (human anatomy)